The Africa Zone was one of the four zones within Group 3 of the regional Davis Cup competition in 2015. The zone's competition was held in round robin format in Cairo, Egypt, in October 2015. The eight competing nations were divided into two pools of four. The winners and runners up from each pool played off to determine the two nations to be promoted to Europe/Africa Zone Group II in 2016, while the third and fourth placed nations played to off to determine overall placings within the group.

Participating nations

Draw

The eight teams were divided into two pools of four. The winner of each pool plays off against the runner-up of the other pool, and the two winners of these play-offs are promoted to Europe/Africa Zone Group II in 2016. The third and fourth placed teams in each pool play off against the equivalent team from the other pool to determine overall rankings within the group.

The group was staged from 26 to 29 October 2015 at the Smash Tennis Academy in Cairo, Egypt.

Pool A

Pool B

First round

Pool A

Algeria vs. Tunisia

Namibia vs. Ghana

Algeria vs. Ghana

Namibia vs. Tunisia

Algeria vs. Namibia

Ghana vs. Tunisia

Pool B

Egypt vs. Mozambique

Benin vs. Libya

Egypt vs. Libya

Benin vs. Mozambique

Benin vs. Egypt

Mozambique vs. Libya

Play-offs

Promotion

Tunisia vs. Benin

Egypt vs. Namibia

5th place play-off: Algeria vs. Mozambique

7th place play-off: Ghana vs. Libya

Outcomes

References

2015 Davis Cup Europe/Africa Zone
Davis Cup Europe/Africa Zone